The men's 4 x 100 metres relay at the 2013 World Championships in Athletics was held at the Luzhniki Stadium on 18 August.

Out of the blocks USA took the lead, passing first and building a small lead.  A small lead is not adequate when Jamaica has Usain Bolt on the anchor.  During the third handoff, Justin Gatlin seemed to go wide while struggling to get the baton, still in the lead while Jamaica had a smoother handoff.  Once free of the technicalities, the multi gold medalist easily pulled away for the win.
Great Britain finished the race in third place but were disqualified after passing the baton outside the takeover zone on the second changeover.  Canada then took the bronze.

Records
Prior to the competition, the records were as follows:

Qualification standards

Schedule

Results

Heats
Qualification: First 2 of each heat (Q) plus the 2 fastest times (q) advanced to the final.

Final
The final was started at 18:40.

References

External links
4x 100 metres relay results at IAAF website

4 x 100 metres relay
Relays at the World Athletics Championships
4 × 100 metres relay